Cyrestis achates is a butterfly of the family Nymphalidae. It is found in south-east Asia.

The larvae feed on Ficus species. They feed in large groups.

Subspecies
Cyrestis achates achates (Aru to West Irian to Papua and Goodenough Island)
Cyrestis achates bougainvillei Ribbe (Bougainville, Guadalcanal, Santa Isabel)
Cyrestis achates whitmei Butler (Loyalty Islands, New Caledonia)

References

Cyrestinae
Butterflies described in 1865